Judith Nyman Secondary School is a high school in Brampton, Ontario, Canada. It is one of two vocational schools operated by the Peel District School Board, the other being West Credit Secondary School in Mississauga.

Upon graduation from Judith Nyman Secondary School, students receive an Ontario Secondary School Diploma or Certificate and may also qualify for a Skills Portfolio, which lists the trade-specific skills that the student has mastered through his or her in-school and co-op education courses.

The school was originally known as North Peel Secondary School, but was renamed in 2010 after a former administrator and Associate Director of the Peel District School Board.

In 2010, comedian Russell Peters established the Russell Peters North Peel Scholarship, an award worth up to $21,000 and intended to finance up to three years of college. It will be awarded annually to a student from Judith Nyman Secondary School (formerly North Peel) with a strong academic record and the intention of attending college.

Notable alumni

 Russell Peters, comedian and actor

See also
List of high schools in Ontario

References

External links
 Judith Nyman Secondary School
Old North Peel Website

Peel District School Board
High schools in Brampton
Educational institutions established in 1978
1978 establishments in Ontario